Kundysh River may refer to several places:

Bolshoy Kundysh River, a river in Kirov Oblast and Mari El, Russia
Maly Kundysh River, a river in Mari El, Russia